Federico Marchetti (born 7 February 1983) is an Italian professional footballer who plays as a goalkeeper for Serie A club Spezia.

Marchetti began his professional club career with Torino in 2002, and was subsequently loaned out to Pro Vercelli, Crotone, and Treviso. In 2005, he spent a season with Biellese, and later played for AlbinoLeffe and Cagliari, before moving to Lazio in 2011, where he won the Coppa Italia in 2013. At international level, he has represented Italy at the 2010 FIFA World Cup, at the 2013 FIFA Confederations Cup (winning a bronze medal), and at UEFA Euro 2016.

Club career

Early career 
A Torino youth system trainee, Marchetti made his professional debut on loan to Pro Vercelli, being then loaned to a number of other Serie C1 and Serie C2 teams in the following years: he spent the 2003–04 season as second choice keeper with Crotone and later Treviso, without making a single appearance with any of these teams. He started the 2004–05 season as third-choice keeper Torino, making a single appearance in his time with the granata as a substitute; he then asked to be transferred in January 2005, after Torino signed another keeper, Gianluca Berti, and he was subsequently loaned to Pro Vercelli for the remainder of the season.

AlbinoLeffe 
In mid-2005, Torino which originally promoted to Serie A, went bankrupt and a new team started again in Serie B as successor, and all of the old Torino players were allowed to leave for free. He was signed by AlbinoLeffe and left for Biellese in co-ownership deal.

In June 2006, he was bought back by Serie B club AlbinoLeffe, initially as reserve to Paolo Acerbis. In his first season with the celeste, he made 13 appearances, being successively promoted as first choice keeper the following season.

During the 2007–08 season, his performances proved to be instrumental in AlbinoLeffe's historic first qualification to the promotion playoffs, where his club narrowly missed promotion to Lecce. He subsequently won the Serie B best goalkeeper award, thus raising significant interest from top-flight teams.

Cagliari 
In July 2008, Cagliari agreed a loan bid with AlbinoLeffe for the goalkeeper, with Cagliari having an option to buy 50% of players' rights to an agreed price.

In his first season in the Serie A, Marchetti confirmed his performances, firmly ensuring a place in the starting lineup, his performances being praised by several football pundits, being also defined by Gianluigi Buffon as his favourite Italian young goalkeeper. On 1 February 2010, Cagliari bought the remain rights from AlbinoLeffe.

However, he was frozen by the club in 2010–11 season, as his transfer request denied He became the third keeper, behind Michael Agazzi and Ivan Pelizzoli. He was unfrozen on 3 April 2011, winning Genoa as unused bench.

Lazio 
Following the departure of their Uruguay international Fernando Muslera at the end of the 2010–11 season, Marchetti joined Lazio. President Claudio Lotito activated Marchetti's €5.2 million release clause. Marchetti arrived in Rome on 5 July to undertake a medical and sign a five-year contract. He described his move to Lazio as "the end of a nightmare".
Marchetti played a terrific season for Lazio and his presence and command over the defence together with his numerous saves helped Lazio achieve two consecutive Europa League qualifications with 5th and 4th-place finishes in the 2010–11 and 2011–12 Serie A campaigns respectively.

Federico Marchetti's continued period of good form during the 2012–13 season saw become one of the club's protagonists; on 26 May 2013, he won the Coppa Italia with Lazio, keeping a clean sheet in a historic 1–0 Rome derby final victory against cross-city rivals Roma. His performances led him to be called up once again to the Italian national team.

Genoa 
Marchetti was acquired by Genoa on 2 July 2018 on a free transfer after his contract expired with Lazio.

Spezia 
On 21 January 2023 signed a 6 months contract for Spezia until the end of the season.

International career 
In May 2009, following his impressive performances with Cagliari, Marchetti received his first call-up to Marcello Lippi's Italian national team for a friendly game versus Northern Ireland. He was featured in the game as a starter, and played the whole match, also keeping a clean sheet in a clear 3–0 win for the azzurri. Marchetti surprisingly made his World Cup debut in the 2010 edition of the tournament in South Africa, when he replaced the injured starter Gianluigi Buffon at half time during Italy's opening Group F clash with Paraguay, which ended in a 1–1 draw. Marchetti kept a clean sheet, as Italy were already 1–0 down at the time of his introduction. In Marchetti's next two matches, he allowed four goals from five shots on goal, as Italy suffered a 1–1 draw against New Zealand, and a 3–2 defeat to Slovakia, and were ultimately eliminated from the tournament in the first round, failing to win a match, and finishing last in their group with only two points.

Marchetti played only one game for the Italy national team under new coach Cesare Prandelli between 2010 and 2012. In 2013, however, Marchetti was recalled by Prandelli to represent Italy in a friendly match against Netherlands. Marchetti was also selected for Prandelli's 23-man Italy squad for the 2013 FIFA Confederations Cup, as a back-up behind Buffon and Salvatore Sirigu; the Confederations Cup 2013 was Marchetti's second major international tournament with Italy, after previously featuring in the 2010 World Cup, and the Italians went on to earn a third-place finish. On 14 August 2013, Marchetti was brought on for the second half of an international friendly match, in honour of Pope Francis, between Italy and Argentina, played in Rome.

On 31 May 2016, Marchetti was included in Antonio Conte's 23-man Italy squad for UEFA Euro 2016, but remained as the only member of the squad not to play in the tournament.

Style of play 
A strong, agile and reliable shot-stopper, Marchetti is considered to be one of the best Italian goalkeepers of his generation; due to his promising performances in his youth, he was considered a possible heir to Gianluigi Buffon as Italy's starting goalkeeper, who himself praised the youngster. He is known in particular for his composure, concentration, and his explosive reactions in goal, as well as his speed and bravery when rushing off his line. In his youth, he played as a forward before switching to the role of goalkeeper. Due to his long hair, he earned the nickname Tarzan from the Lazio fans.

Career statistics

Club

International

Honours 
Lazio
 Coppa Italia: 2012–13

References

External links 
 Profile at AIC 
 Profile at FIGC 

1983 births
Living people
Italian footballers
Italy international footballers
Association football goalkeepers
U.C. AlbinoLeffe players
Cagliari Calcio players
F.C. Crotone players
Genoa C.F.C. players
S.S. Lazio players
Sportspeople from the Province of Vicenza
F.C. Pro Vercelli 1892 players
Torino F.C. players
Treviso F.B.C. 1993 players
Spezia Calcio players
Serie A players
Serie B players
2010 FIFA World Cup players
2013 FIFA Confederations Cup players
UEFA Euro 2016 players
A.S.D. La Biellese players
Footballers from Veneto